Micraroter is an extinct genus of microsaur within the family Ostodolepidae.

References

Ostodolepids
Cisuralian amphibians of North America
Fossil taxa described in 1973